Ollen is a  long river of Lower Saxony, Germany. It discharges into the Hunte through an old branch of the Hunte near Berne.

See also
List of rivers of Lower Saxony

Rivers of Lower Saxony
Rivers of Germany